{{DISPLAYTITLE:C13H21NO2}}
The molecular formula C13H21NO2 (molar mass : 223.31 g/mol, exact mass : 223.157229) may refer to :
 Ariadne (psychedelic)
 Beatrice (psychedelic)
 2C-P
 2C-iP
 2,5-Dimethoxy-4-ethylamphetamine
 Ganesha (psychedelic)
 Iris (psychedelic)
 Toliprolol